Houghton Conquest is a village and civil parish located in the Central Bedfordshire district of Bedfordshire, England. The parish also includes the hamlet of How End.

History
Historically in the hundred of Redbornestoke, the name of the village originated from the Conquest family who held a manor and lands in the area from the 13th century to the 18th century.
The Houghton in Houghton Conquest is pronounced 'how-ton', and this has been the official pronunciation since at least 1998.

The Church of All Saints was constructed in the village during the 14th century, and is today the largest parish church in Bedfordshire. Features of interest include the wall paintings, sculpture, stained glass, benches and stalls. In 2018 all of the lead, weighing 21 tonnes, was stolen from the church roof.

Manors 
The Conquest family owned Conquestbury, a large manor which was left to ruin when the family left the area. The Conquestbury manor house stood near the southeast end of the village on the ground now known as Bury Farm, adjacent to London Lane. The Manor and its lands then passed to the Beauchamp family. Parts of the original house were used to build a house in the 1850s, which today serves as a village shop.

Houghton House was also built in the area in approximately 1615. In 1794, Francis Russell, 5th Duke of Bedford stripped Houghton House of its furnishings and removed the roof. Today, the remains of Houghton House stand as ruins.

Geography
The village  is located in the northern part of Central Bedfordshire, on the border with the Borough of Bedford. Local amenities include a village shop, post office, Houghton Conquest Lower School, a village hall, and three pubs named "The Knife and Cleaver", "The Royal Oak" and "The Chequers".

See also
List of English and Welsh endowed schools (19th century)

References

Further reading
 
 John William Burgon: Memorandum relating to the parish of Houghton Conquest in Bedfordshire. First published 1903–1904 in the Houghton Conquest Parish Magazine, Edited by Herbert W. Macklin.

External links

 Houghton Conquest in GENUKI
 Houghton Conquest Lower School.

Villages in Bedfordshire
Civil parishes in Bedfordshire
Central Bedfordshire District